1980 Football Championship of Ukrainian SSR was the 50th season of association football competition of the Ukrainian SSR, which was part of the Soviet Second League in Zone 5. The season started on 5 April 1981. This season the Soviet Second League went through minor reorganization and Ukrainian Championship was moved from the Zone 2 to Zone 5. The Moldavian Avtomobilist Tiraspol was removed from the competition and placed in different zone.

The 1980 Football Championship of Ukrainian SSR was won by SKA Kiev. Qualified for the interzonal playoffs, the team from Kiev managed to gain promotion by placing first in its group.

The "Ruby Cup" of Molod Ukrayiny newspaper (for the most scored goals) was received by SKA Kiev.

Teams

Location map

Promoted teams
Stakhanovets Stakhanov – Champion of the Fitness clubs competitions (KFK) (debut)

Renamed teams
 Stakhanovets Stakhanov was called Shakhtar Stakhanov

Realigned teams
 Avtomobilist Tiraspol was moved to Zone VIII

Final standings

Top goalscorers
The following were the top ten goalscorers.

See also
 Soviet Second League

Notes

External links
 1980 Soviet Second League, Zone 6 (Ukrainian SSR football championship). Luhansk football portal
 1980 Soviet championships (all leagues) at helmsoccer.narod.ru

1980
3
Soviet
Soviet
football
Football Championship of the Ukrainian SSR